The 1972 Ruisui earthquake (also known as the 1972 Juisui earthquake) occurred on April 24 at . The magnitude of this earthquake was given as  7.2 by the United States Geological Survey and  6.9 by the Central Weather Bureau of Taiwan. The epicenter was located near Ruisui Township, Hualien County, Taiwan. The intensity was shindo 4 in Taipei and Hualien. Five people were reported dead. The Ruisui Bridge was destroyed. The water treatment plant in Ruisui was damaged.

The boundary between the Eurasian Plate and the Philippine Plate lies along the Longitudinal Valley Fault.

See also 
 Huatung Valley (or Longitudinal Valley)
 List of earthquakes in 1972
 List of earthquakes in Taiwan

References

External links 

Ruisui Earthquake, 1972
Ruisui Earthquake, 1972
Earthquakes in Taiwan